The Return of the Magnificent is the second studio album by DJ Jazzy Jeff. It was released via BBE and Rapster Records in 2007. It is the official follow-up to The Magnificent (2002). It includes guest appearances from CL Smooth, Big Daddy Kane, Jean Grae, J-Live, Twone Gabs, and Kel Spencer. The album cover is based on the Deodato 2 cover by Eumir Deodato.

Track listing

Charts

References

External links
 

2007 albums
DJ Jazzy Jeff albums
Barely Breaking Even albums